Mihavatsy is a town and commune in Madagascar. It belongs to the district of Sakaraha, which is a part of Atsimo-Andrefana Region. The population of the commune was estimated to be approximately 3,000 in 2001 commune census.

Only primary schooling is available. The majority 55% of the population of the commune are farmers, while an additional 44% receives their livelihood from raising livestock. The most important crop is cassava, while other important products are maize and taro.  Services provide employment for 1% of the population.

References and notes 

Populated places in Atsimo-Andrefana